"One Last Ride" is the series finale of the television sitcom Parks and Recreation. It serves as the 12th and 13th episodes of season 7 and the 124th and 125th overall episode of the series. It was written by lead actress Amy Poehler and series co-creator Michael Schur, the latter of whom also directed the episode. The series finale first aired on NBC in the United States on February 24, 2015, when it was watched by 4.15 million viewers, making it the most-watched episode of the season and the highest-rated episode since "Campaign Ad" of season four.

With the majority of the season being spent closing long-running storylines, this episode serves as a standalone plot while also saying goodbye to both the characters and the city of Pawnee. The episode received acclaim from critics.

Plot

Present (2017)
The gang all gather inside the parks department before business hours, as many of them are leaving Pawnee, to reminisce about their time together there. A citizen comes in, saying that a swing set behind his house on a playground has been broken for about three months. Leslie (Amy Poehler) sees this as an opportunity for them all to go on one last mission together as she is worried these people will never be together again in the same room at the same time. The gang agrees, with Leslie saying goodbye to everyone on the way to getting it fixed. After fixing the swing, the group gathers for a picture together and Ben asks Leslie if she is ready. In the last shot of the series, Leslie smiles at the camera, and says "Yes. I'm ready."

The Future
After his interim term, Garry (Jim O'Heir) is elected mayor after a massive write-in campaign. In 2019, Craig (Billy Eichner) continues to work at Tom's Bistro, where he meets Typhoon, Donna and Ron's old hairdresser, and the two end up getting married (with Ron as their best man) and living a long life together. Elsewhere, Tom (Aziz Ansari), now married to Lucy (Natalie Morales), looks to expand his restaurant business, only to lose almost all his money because of an economic recession. He then uses his experiences with failure to become a best selling author and motivational speaker.

In 2022, Andy (Chris Pratt) wants to have kids despite April's (Aubrey Plaza) reluctance. After advice and support from Ben (Adam Scott) and Leslie, April and Andy decide they are ready for kids. April later gives birth to a boy, Jack, on Halloween. Elsewhere, Jean-Ralphio (Ben Schwartz) fakes his death with his sister Mona-Lisa (Jenny Slate) for the insurance money with plans to leave the country and start up a casino, but is caught when he spies on his own funeral. Ron (Nick Offerman) resigns from the Very Good Building Company, and turns to Leslie to help him, as he is at a personal crossroads; Leslie makes him the superintendent of the Pawnee National Park, where he spends his days patrolling the forest. In 2023, Donna (Retta) and Joe (Keegan-Michael Key) are living happily in Seattle, where Donna's real-estate firm has been extremely successful due to a resurgence in the housing market. With help from April, Donna sets up an online learning initiative with her husband called "Teach Yo' Self" with Donna's commission money.

In 2025, at the Bidens' home, Leslie is approached about running for governor of Indiana. Meanwhile, Ben is approached by Jennifer Barkley (Kathryn Hahn) about running for the same position. The two try and figure out how to decide which one shall run, and head back to Pawnee to help with their decision. They decide to stop by the parks department, where the entire gang – and their respective kids – have gathered to give them support and reunite, including Ann (Rashida Jones) and Chris (Rob Lowe). While there, April and Andy reveal they are having another child, and Ann and Chris reveal that they are returning to Pawnee. It's revealed that Leslie and Ann have secretly conspired to spark a romance between their teenaged children, Oliver and Sonia, and their efforts appear to be succeeding.  Ben and Leslie decide to flip a coin to see who will run. However, right before the two announce that one of them will run, Ben tells everyone that Leslie is the one who will be running, as he knows this has been her dream for her entire life.

In 2035, Leslie is making a commencement speech at Indiana University, where it is confirmed she is now governor, and has been for two consecutive terms. The university also names its library after Leslie, an unwelcome honor due to the long-standing antipathy between Pawnee's library and parks departments.

In 2048, Leslie and Ben attend the funeral of Garry, who continued to be mayor of Pawnee until his death at the age of 100. At his funeral, Leslie and Ben are surrounded by Secret Service members, implying that either Ben or Leslie has become the President of the United States or the Vice President of the United States. They both notice that the carving on Garry's tombstone misspells his last name, but neither of them care enough to attempt to correct the mistake or even tell anyone else about it.

Producer's cut
In the producer's cut of the episode, Shauna Malwae-Tweep's (Alison Becker) and Jeremy Jamm's (Jon Glaser) futures are explored. In 2018, Shauna's fiancé leaves her at the altar, and Bobby Newport (Paul Rudd) sees her crying on a park bench. Shauna and Bobby end up getting married five hours later. In 2020, Jamm is working in a hibachi restaurant in Florida.

Final frame

The episode aired a few days after the death of writer and producer Harris Wittels, who also appeared on the show as dim-witted animal control employee Harris. The final frame of the series featured the message, "We love you, Harris," from the cast and crew.

Reception

Ratings
The episode received ratings of 4.15 million viewers, almost double the average number per episode.

Critical response
The episode received overwhelming acclaim from critics and fans alike. IGN gave the episode a 10 out of 10, calling it a "masterpiece". Additionally, Alasdair Wilkins of The A.V. Club gave the episode an "A" rating, stating that "the experience of watching 'One Last Ride' was something [he's] not sure [he's] ever had before with a television show", praising the phenomenal end to the series. HitFix's Alan Sepinwall also admired the episode, stating that "after this great final season, and this wonderful final episode, [he] remain[s] very much not ready for a future without Parks and Recreation, even though it ended so definitively, and so well". The episode holds an "Extremely Positive" consensus on Metacritic, the highest calibre of reviews an episode can receive on the database.

Accolades

References

External links
 
 

2015 American television episodes
Parks and Recreation (season 7) episodes
American television series finales
Television episodes written by Michael Schur
Cultural depictions of Joe Biden